Sarmin Subdistrict  is a Syrian nahiyah (subdistrict) located in Idlib District in Idlib.  According to the Syria Central Bureau of Statistics (CBS), Sarmin Subdistrict had a population of 14530 in the 2004 census.

References 

Subdistricts of Idlib Governorate